Sheppard Pratt at Elkridge is a private psychiatric hospital under construction in Elkridge, Maryland. The hospital will serve as a replacement location for nearby Sheppard Pratt at Ellicott City.

Background
In December 2010, Sheppard Pratt Health System announced plans to move its 92-bed facility at Taylor Manor in Ellicott City to a new location in Elkridge, Maryland. With its lease expiring at the end of 2018, the hospital began searching for a replacement location. A 40-acre parcel in located southwest of the junction of Interstate 95 and Maryland Route 100 was purchased for $9 million. The healthcare provider has cited the move as a way to expand access to its services to a larger population. Master plans have estimated that the new facility will cost greater than $100 million.

See also
The Sheppard and Enoch Pratt Hospital
Sheppard Pratt at Ellicott City

References

Elkridge, Maryland
Howard County, Maryland
Hospitals in Maryland
Mental health in the United States